In the USSR, latinisation or latinization was the name of the campaign during the 1920s–1930s which aimed to replace traditional writing systems for all languages of the Soviet Union with systems that would use the Latin script or to create Latin-script-based systems for languages that, at the time, did not have a writing system.

History

Background 
Since at least 1700, some Russian intellectuals have sought to Latinise the Russian language in their desire for close relations with the West.

The early 20th-century Bolsheviks had four goals: to break with Tsarism, to spread socialism to the whole world, to isolate the Muslim inhabitants of the Soviet Union from the Arabic–Islamic world and religion, and to eradicate illiteracy through simplification. They concluded the Latin alphabet was the right tool to do so, and, after seizing power during the Russian Revolution of 1917, they made plans to realise these ideals.

Although progress was slow at first, in 1926, the Turkic-majority republics of the Soviet Union adopted the Latin script, giving a major boost to reformers in neighbouring Turkey. When Mustafa Kemal Atatürk adopted the new Turkish Latin alphabet in 1928, this in turn encouraged the Soviet leaders to proceed. By 1933, it was estimated that among some language groups that had shifted from an Arabic-based script to Latin, literacy rates rose from 2% to 60%.

Procedure 
After the Russian Revolution, as the Soviets looked to build a state that better accommodated the diverse national groups that had made up the Russian Empire, support for literacy and national languages became a major political project. Soviet nationalities policy called for conducting education and government work in national languages, which spurred the need for linguistic reform. Among the Islamic and Turkic peoples of Central Asia, the most common literary script for their languages was based on Arabic or Persian script; however, these were considered a hinderance to literacy, particularly for Turkic languages because of its lack of scripted vowels.
In the 1920s, efforts were made to modify the Arabic (such as the Yaña imlâ alphabet developed for Tatar), but some groups adopted Latin-based alphabets instead. Because of past conflict with tsarist missionaries, a Latin-based script was viewed as "less odious" than a Cyrillic one. By the end of the decade, the move towards latinisation was in full swing. On August 8, 1929, by the decree of the Central Executive Committee and the Council of People's Commissars of the USSR "On the New Latinised Alphabet of the Peoples of the Arabic Written Language of the USSR" the transition to the Latin alphabet was given an official status for all Turko-Tatar languages in the Soviet Union.

Efforts then began in earnest to expand beyond replacing Arabic script and Turkic languages and to develop Latin-based scripts for all national languages in the Soviet Union. By 1932, Latin-based scripts were developed for almost all Turkic, Iranian, Mongolic, Tungusic, and Uralic languages, totalling 66 of the 72 written languages in the USSR by 1932. There also existed plans to latinise Chinese, Korean, and Russian, along with other Slavic languages.

The VTsK NA completed its work in mid-January 1930; however, on 25 January 1930, General Secretary Joseph Stalin ordered to halt the development of the question of the romanisation of the Cyrillic alphabet for the Russian language. Belarusian, and Ukrainian were similarly placed off limits for latinisation. By 1933, attitudes towards latinisation had shifted dramitically and the all the newly romanised languages were converted to Cyrillic. The only language without an attempt to latinise its script was Georgian.

In total, between 1923 and 1939, Latin alphabets were implemented for 50 out of 72 languages of the USSR that were written, and Latin alphabets were developed for a number of previously exclusively oral languages. In the Mari, Mordovian and Udmurt languages, the use of the Cyrillic alphabet continued even during the period of maximum latinisation due in part to a growing body of literature written with the Cyrillic alphabet in those languages.

In 1936, a new campaign began to move all the languages of the peoples of the USSR to Cyrillic script, which was largely completed by 1940 (German, Georgian, Armenian and Yiddish remained non-cyrillised from the languages common in the USSR; the last three were also never latinised). Later, Polish, Finnish, Latvian, Estonian and Lithuanian languages also remained uncyrillised.

The following languages were latinised or adapted new Latin-based alphabets during the 1920s and 1930s:

 Abaza (1932)
 Abkhaz (Abkhaz alphabet) (1924)
 Adyghe (1926)
 Altai (1929)
 Assyrian (1930)
 Avar (1928)
 Azerbaijani (Azerbaijani alphabet) (1922)
 Balochi (Balochi Latin) (1933)
 Bashkir (1927)
 Bukhori (1929)
 Buryat (1929)
 Chechen (1925)
 Chinese (Latinxua Sin Wenz) (1931)
 Chukchi (Chucki Latin) (1931)
 Crimean Tatar (First Latin) (1927)
 Dargin (1928)
 Dungan (1928)
 Eskimo (1931)
 Even (1931)
 Evenki (Evenki Latin) (1931)
 Ingrian (Ingrian alphabet) (1932)
 Ingush (1923)
 Itelmen (1931)
 Juhuri (1929)
 Kabardiano-Cherkess (1923)
 Kalmyk (1930)
 Karachay-Balkar (1924)
 Karaim (1928)
 Karakalpak (1928)
 Karelian (Karelian alphabet) (1931)
 Kazakh (Kazakh alphabet) (1928)
 Ket (1931)
 Khakas (1929)
 Khanty (1931)
 Komi (1932)
 Komi-Permyak (1932)
 Koryak (1931)
 Krymchak (1928)
 Kumandin (1932)
 Kumyk (1927)
 Kurdish (Kurdish alphabets) (1929)
 Kyrgyz (Kyrgyz alphabets) (1928)
 Lak (1928)
 Laz (1930)
 Lezgin (Lezgin alphabets) (1928)
 Mansi (1931)
 Moldovan (name used in the USSR for Romanian; Moldovan alphabet) (1928)
 Nanai language (1931)
 Nenets languages (1931)
 Nivkh language (1931)
 Nogai language (1928)
 Ossetic language (1923)
 Persian alphabet (1930)
 Sámi language (Kildin & Ter) (1931)
 Selkup language (1931)
 Shor language (1931)
 Shughni language (1932)
 Yakut language (1920/1929)
 Tabasaran language (1932)
 Tajik alphabet (1928)
 Talysh language (1929)
 Tat language (1933)
 Tatar language (Yañalif) (1928)
 Tsakhur language (1934)
 Turkmen alphabet (1929)
 Udege language (1931)
 Udi language (1934)
 Uyghur language (1928)
 Uzbek language (1927)
 Vepsian language (1932)

Projects were created and approved for the following languages, but were not implemented:

 Aleut language
 Arabic language
 Korean language
 Udmurt language

See also 
 Cyrillisation in the Soviet Union
 Korenizatsiya
 Yañalif
 Uniform Turkic Alphabet
 Unified Northern Alphabet
 Cyrillization of Chinese
 Belarusian Latin alphabet
 Russian Latin alphabet
 Ukrainian Latin alphabet
 Mongolian Latin alphabet

References

Bibliography 
 

Soviet internal politics
Soviet culture
Romanization
1920s in the Soviet Union
1930s in the Soviet Union